The Edison School District is a K–8 public school district in Edison, California. The district has two schools and serves Edison.

References

External links
Edison School District

School districts in Kern County, California